Arctica was an ancient continent that formed in the Neoarchean era.

Arctica or Arktika may also refer to:

 Arctica (bivalve), a bivalve genus in the family Arcticidae
 "Arctica" (song), a single by Amberian Dawn
 1031 Arctica, a dark asteroid
 Arktika (1972 nuclear icebreaker)
 Arktika-class icebreakers, a class of Soviet and later Russian nuclear icebreakers
 Arktika (2016 nuclear icebreaker), a Project 22220 icebreaker
 Arktika 2007, a Russian expedition involving a crewed descent to the ocean bottom at the North Pole
 Azimut Hotel Murmansk or Artika, a hotel in Russia
 Fratercula arctica, the Atlantic puffin or common puffin, a species of seabird in the auk family
 Physaria arctica, a perennial flowering herb in the family Brassicaceae
 Salix arctica, the Arctic willow, a creeping willow in the family Salicaceae
 Trivia arctica, a marine gastropod mollusc in the family Triviidae

See also

 
 
 
 
 Sonata Arctica, a Finnish power metal band
 Arctic (disambiguation)
 Antarctica (disambiguation)